Eric Baume's Viewpoint, also known simply as Viewpoint, is an Australian television program which aired from 1959 to 1961 on Sydney station TCN-9. Debuting on 13 May 1959, the program was a current affairs program broadcast on Wednesdays. The program included news, comment, and interviews with controversial radio and television personality Eric Baume.

See also
State Your Case
This I Believe

References

External links

1959 Australian television series debuts
1961 Australian television series endings
Australian television news shows
Black-and-white Australian television shows
English-language television shows
Nine Network original programming